MGB2 or MgB2 may refer to:

MgB2, Magnesium diboride a superconductor.
 MGB2. a mammaglobin gene.